= Heaven Scent (band) =

Australian rock band

Heaven Scent is an Australian rock band. In 2002 they donated the proceeds from their single "Short Goodbyes" (which reached No. 99 on the ARIA singles chart) to charity.

== Members ==
- Justin Murphy – vocals, guitar
- Zoltan "Zoli" Juhasz – guitar
- Scott Marvelley – bass
- Aaron Potter – drums
- Felice "Fletch" Lomuto – keyboards
- Paul Edwards – guitar

== Discography ==
=== Albums ===
- Long Story Short (2002) – Sound Vault

=== EPs ===
- Rain (1997)

=== Singles ===
- "Am I Crazy?" (2000)
- "Short Goodbyes" (2002)
- "Anything For You" (2002)
